Sphenella is a genus of the family Tephritidae, better known as fruit flies.

Species
Sphenella atra Munro, 1957
Sphenella aureliani Gheorghiu, 1985
Sphenella crenata Munro, 1957
Sphenella deletrix Munro, 1957
Sphenella helianthoides (Bezzi, 1926)
Sphenella hessei (Munro, 1929)
Sphenella marginata (Fallén, 1814)
Sphenella melanostigma Bezzi, 1908
Sphenella nigricornis Bezzi, 1924
Sphenella nigropilosa Meijere, 1914
Sphenella novaguineensis Hardy, 1988
Sphenella orbicula Munro, 1957
Sphenella rostrata Munro, 1957
Sphenella ruficeps (Macquart, 1851)
Sphenella semisphenella (Bezzi, 1926)
Sphenella setosa Merz & Dawah, 2005
Sphenella sinensis Schiner, 1868
Sphenella ypsilon Munro, 1933

References

Tephritinae
Tephritidae genera